was a Japanese video game developer based in Yodogawa-ku. The company was founded on 15 March 1991 by Kenshi Naruse, who served as its representative director. The company is believed to have shut down in 2002 and most of the staff including Naruse went on to join SNK.

Games developed

References

External links 
 

Japanese companies established in 1991
Video game companies established in 1991
Japanese companies disestablished in 2002
Video game companies disestablished in 2002
Defunct video game companies of Japan